Gail Kern Paster (born 1944) is an American Shakespeare scholar, historian and writer.

Life 

She was born on 8 November 1944.  Paster graduated from North Shore High School (New York) in 1962. She received her bachelor's degree from Smith College and her PhD from Yale University.

Career 

Paster taught at the George Washington University from 1974 to 2002. From 2002 to 2011, she was the director of the Folger Shakespeare Library.

She has also served as editor of the Shakespeare Quarterly magazine.

Bibliography 

Paster's notable books include:

 Humoring the Body: Emotions and the Shakespearean Stage  (2004)
 Reading the Early Modern Passions: Essays in the Cultural History of Emotion 
 A Midsummer Night's Dream: Texts and Contexts
 The Idea of the City in the Age of Shakespeare (1986)
 Michaelmas Term: Thomas Middleton
 The Body Embarrassed: Drama and the Disciplines of Shame in Early Modern England (1993).

References

External links 

 Gail Kern Paster

American women historians
20th-century American historians
1944 births
Living people
20th-century American women writers
21st-century American historians
21st-century American women writers
Shakespearean scholars
Smith College alumni
Yale University alumni
George Washington University faculty